St. Joseph Medical Center is a 310-bed hospital in Kansas City, Missouri, US.

History
At the request of local physician Dr. Jefferson Griffith and Father Bernard Donnelly, six sisters from Sisters of St. Joseph of Carondelet, led by Mother Celeste O’Reilly, arrived in Kansas City, Missouri in 1874 to establish a hospital. The sisters purchased the Waterman home, a 10-room residence at Pennsylvania Avenue and 7th Street in Quality Hill and opened Saint Joseph's Hospital on October 15, 1874. In 1917, Saint Joseph's Hospital moved to a new 250-bed facility located at 2510 East Linwood Boulevard. The hospital moved to its present-day location near I-435 and State Line Road in 1977. Prime Healthcare purchased St. Joseph Medical Center from Ascension in 2015.

References

Hospitals in Kansas City, Missouri
Hospitals established in 1874
Catholic hospitals in North America
1874 establishments in Missouri